JS Sōryū (SS-501) is the first boat of the s. She was commissioned on 30 March 2009.

Operational history
Sōryū was laid down at Mitsubishi Heavy Industries Kobe Shipyard on 31 March 2005 as the 2900-ton submarine No. 8116, based on the medium-term defense capability development that was planned in 2004. At the launching ceremony on 5 December 2007, she was named Sōryū and launched, subsequently deploying to Kure.

After leaving Yura Port for confirmation operation after regular inspection before 7:00 am on 8 October 2012, Sōryū began diving started at 8:47 am. At around 2:18 pm, a petty officer disappeared on duty during the dive. When the Sōryū surfaced and a search was conducted, he was found to be in the flooded area inside the bridge sail. The Accident Investigation Commission concluded that the seaman committed suicide.

On 2 September 2013, while the Sōryū was anchored at Kure base, an officer attempted to commit suicide in his quarters, using a pistol taken from the boat's weapons locker. Although the suicide attempt was unsuccessful, the officer was left with a serious disability. In 2015, the Maritime Self-Defense Force determined that the cause of the suicide attempt was the assault by a superior officer, and took disciplinary action by suspending the senior officer and those who had tolerated the assault. However, it was reported in various media on 12 January 2016 that the JMSDF had not announced the disposition of their investigation because of ongoing discussions. The parents of the disabled officer announced that they filed a lawsuit in the Yamaguchi District Court in January 2016, seeking damages of 30 million yen against the government.

The Sōryū participated in the Japan-US-India Joint Training (Malabar 2018) exercise held on and around Guam Island from 8 to 16 June 2018.

The submarine sustained damage to its communications equipment, conning tower, and diving planes, and three Japanese sailors were injured. The commercial vessel suffered no damage or injuries.

Citations

References 
『世界の艦船 増刊第66集 海上自衛隊全艦艇史』（海人社、2004年）

External links

2006 ships
Sōryū-class submarines
Ships built by Mitsubishi Heavy Industries